Matthew Hutton (1529–1606) was archbishop of York from 1595 to 1606.

Life
 

Hutton, the son of Matthew Hutton of Priest Hutton, in the parish of Warton, Lancashire, was born in that parish in 1529. He was educated at Lancaster Royal Grammar School (then called the Free School at Lancaster). He became a sizar at Trinity College, Cambridge in 1546. After graduating B.A. 1551–2, he became a fellow of Trinity in 1553, and graduated M.A. 1555 and B.D. 1562. In 1561 he was elected Lady Margaret's Professor of Divinity, and next year master of Pembroke Hall, and regius professor of divinity. In the same year he was collated prebendary of St Paul's, London, and in 1563 instituted rector of Boxworth, Cambridgeshire (resigned in 1576). About the same time he obtained a canonry at Ely. In 1564 he distinguished himself by his ability in the theological disputations before Queen Elizabeth at Cambridge, and his character was established as one of the ablest scholars and preachers in the university. He was created D.D. there in 1565, and later in the year was installed a canon of Westminster. In the succeeding year he was one of the Lent preachers at court and a preacher at St Paul's Cross. After his appointment in April 1567 as dean of York he resigned his mastership at Pembroke, the regius professorship, and his canonries of Ely and Westminster. Subsequently, he was collated to prebends at York and Southwell. He was suggested as fit to succeed Edmund Grindal in the see of London in 1570, but his election was opposed by Archbishop Parker. A letter to Burghley, dated 6 October 1573, is preserved at Hatfield, giving at length his opinions on prevailing differences in church government. He was suspected of leaning to the Puritans, and this led to a dispute with Archbishop Sandys, who in 1586 preferred a charge of thirteen articles against him. Hutton defended himself with spirit, and, though compelled to make submission, admitted nothing more than the use of violent and indiscreet expressions.

On 9 June 1589 he was elected through Burghley's influence to the bishopric of Durham. On 11 December 1594, and in February 1595, he wrote beautiful and pathetic appeals to Burghley on behalf of Lady Margaret Neville, who had been condemned on account of the rebellion of her father, Charles, 6th Earl of Westmorland, and he was not only successful in his application for mercy, but gained a pension for the lady.

On 14 February 1595/6 he was elected archbishop of York. The grammar school and almshouses at Warton were shortly afterwards founded by him. In John Harington's Nugæ Antiquæ, ii. 248, there is an account of a bold sermon which he preached before Queen Elizabeth at Whitehall. He acted as lord president of the north from 1595 to 1600, and in 1598 he had in his custody at Bishopsthorpe Sir Robert Ker of Cessford, one of the wardens of the Scottish Marches. His courtesy to his prisoner was afterwards acknowledged by King James and by Sir Robert himself. One of his last public acts was to write a letter to Robert Cecil, Lord Cranborne, counselling a relaxation in the prosecution of the puritans. He died at Bishopthorpe on 16 January 1605/6, and was buried in York Minster. His monument is in the south aisle of the choir.

He married in 1565 Catherine Fulmetby, or Fulmesby, who died soon after. In 1567 he married Beatrice, daughter of Sir Thomas Fincham. She died on 5 May 1582, and on 20 November following he married Frances, widow of Martin Bowes (died 1573), son of Sir Martin Bowes. (The archbishop's wife Frances left to her grandson Matthew Bowes her home in Coppergate, York, that she had purchased from "Parcivall Levett of York, merchant.") The archbishop left several children by the second marriage. Of these, Timothy Hutton, the eldest son, born 1569, was knighted in 1605, the year in which he was high sheriff of Yorkshire, and died in 1629; the second son was Sir Thomas Hutton of Popleton (d. 1620). The archbishop was blamed by some for granting leases of church lands to his children, which apparently considerably enriched them. He was an ancestor of Matthew Hutton (Archbishop of Canterbury) (1693–1758).

A portrait of Hutton is at Marske, Richmondshire, in the possession of descendants. A second portrait was twice engraved, first by Perry, and secondly for William Hutchinson's History and Antiquities of the County Palatine of Durham. The Hutton Correspondence, edited by James Raine and published by the Surtees Society in 1843, contains many of the archbishop's letters.

Works

He is author of:
A Sermon preached at York before … Henry, Earle of Huntington, London, 1579, 12mo.
Brevis et Dilucida Explicatio veræ, certæ, et consolationis plenæ doctrinæ de Electione, Prædestinatione ac Reprobatione, Harderwijk, 1613, 8vo.

Notes

References

Attribution
 The entry cites:
Cooper's Athenæ Cantabr. ii. 421, and authorities there cited
Hutton Correspondence, ed. by James Raine, 1843, for Surtees Society 
Calend. of MSS. preserved at Hatfield (Hist. MSS. Com.), ii. 60
Fuller's Worthies, "Lancashire"
British Museum Catalogue

External links

Hutton of Marske, Burke's Genealogical and Heraldic History of the Landed Gentry, Bernard Burke, 1847
Hutton of Marske, A Genealogical and Heraldic History of the Landed Gentry, Bernard Burke, 1862

1529 births
1606 deaths
Archbishops of York
Bishops of Durham
Deans of York
Doctors of Divinity
Masters of Pembroke College, Cambridge
People from Lancaster, Lancashire
16th-century Church of England bishops
17th-century Anglican archbishops
Alumni of Trinity College, Cambridge
Fellows of Trinity College, Cambridge
Regius Professors of Divinity (University of Cambridge)
Lady Margaret's Professors of Divinity